The Nigerian Stock Exchange (NSE) now Nigerian Exchange Group is a Nigerian stock exchange founded in 1961 in Lagos. As of November 2019, it has a total of 161 listed companies, with 8 domestic companies on the premium board, 144 companies on the mainboard, and 4 on the Alternative Securities Market (ASeM) board. In the Fixed Income market, the NSE has 84 FGN bonds, 21 state bonds, 27 corporate bonds, 1 supranational bond, and 53 memorandum listings.

Mission 
The NSE mission is to enable businesses and investors to have reliable access to capital and provide secure saving systems and structure for effective and efficient business operations.

History
The Nigerian Stock Exchange was founded as the Lagos Stock Exchange, on September 15, 1960. The Lagos Stock Exchange is the oldest existing stock exchange in West Africa. There were seven subscribers to the Exchange’s Memorandum of Association: R.S.V. Scott, representing C.T. Bowring and Co. Nigeria Ltd.; Chief Theophilus Adebayo Doherty; John Holt Ltd; Investment Company of Nig. Ltd.(ICON); Sir. Odumegwu Ojukwu; Chief Akintola Williams; and Alhaji Shehu Bukar.

Operations began officially on August 25, 1961, with 19 securities listed for trading. However, informal operations had commenced earlier in June 1961. Operations were initially conducted inside the Central Bank building with four firms as market dealers: Inlaks, John Holt, C.T. Bowring, and ICON (Investment Company of Nigeria). The volume for August 1961, was about 80,500 pounds and it rose to about 250,000 pounds in September of the same year with the bulk of the investments in government securities. In December 1977 it became known as The Nigerian Stock Exchange, with branches established in some of the major commercial cities of the country. In 2021, the NSE launched a new brand identity into what is today known as the Nigerian Exchange Group, following its demutualisation and the resulting creation of the non-operating holding company NGX Group Plc.

Operations
The Nigerian Stock Exchange has been operating an Automated Trading System (ATS) since April 27, 1999, with dealers trading through a computer network. In 2013, the NSE launched its next-generation trading platform, X-Gen, intended to enable electronic trading for the retail and institutional segments. Trading on The Exchange starts at 9.30 a.m. and closes at 2.30 p.m. every Monday - Friday. Market prices, along with an All-Share Index, NSE 30, and Sector Indices, are published daily in The Stock Exchange Daily Official List, The Nigerian Stock Exchange CAPNET (an intranet facility), newspapers, and on the stock market page of the Reuters Electronic Contributor System. Historical price and performance data are also posted on the NSE website.

In order to encourage foreign investment into Nigeria, the government has abolished legislation preventing the flow of foreign capital into the country. This has allowed foreign brokers to enlist as dealers on the Nigerian Stock Exchange, and investors of any nationality are free to invest. Nigerian companies are also allowed multiple and cross-border listings on foreign markets.

In a bid to promote transparency and trust in the capital market, the NSE reconstituted the Investors' Protection Fund in 2012. The Fund is mandated to compensate investors who suffer pecuniary loss arising from the revocation or cancellation of the registration of a dealing member; insolvency, bankruptcy or negligence of a dealing member; or defalcation committed by a dealing member or any of its directors, officers, employees or representatives.

Regulation
The NSE is regulated by the Nigerian Securities and Exchange Commission.

Leadership & Subsidiaries 
The Nigerian Exchange Group is led by a Group Chief Executive, a position currently held by Oscar N. Onyema. Following the demutualisation and rebranding in 2021, the NGX is made up of the following wholly owned subsidiaries:

 Nigerian Exchange Limited (NGX) which is the operating exchange 
 NGX Regulation Limited (NGX REGCO), the independent securities regulator, and 
 NGX Real Estate Limited (NGX RELCO), the real estate company.

In October 2022, the NGX Board announced the appointment of Dr. Umaru Kwairanga as its new chairman and Mr. Oluwole Adeosun as the Vice Chairman.

Indices
The Exchange maintains a value-weighted All-Share Index formulated in January 1984 (January 3, 1984, = 100). Its highest value of 66,371.20 was recorded on March 3, 2008. The Exchange also uses the NSE-30 Index, which is a sample-based capitalization-weighted index, as well five sector indices. These are the NSE Consumer Goods Index, NSE Banking Index, NSE Insurance Index, NSE Industrial Index, and NSE Oil/Gas Index.

Associations
The Nigerian Exchange is a member of the World Federation of Exchanges (FIBV). It is also an observer at meetings of the International Organization of Securities Commissions (IOSCO) and a founding member of the African Stock Exchanges Association (ASEA). On 31 October 2013, it joined the Sustainable Stock Exchanges Initiative (SSE).

See also

List of African stock exchanges
List of stock exchanges
List of stock exchanges in the Commonwealth of Nations

References

 
Stock exchanges in Africa
Stock exchanges in Nigeria
Financial services companies established in 1961
Economy of Lagos
Organizations based in Lagos